Montgomery "Lightning" McQueen is a fictional anthropomorphic stock car who is the protagonist of the animated Pixar franchise Cars, primarily voiced by actor Owen Wilson. His appearances include the feature films Cars, Cars 2, and Cars 3, as well as in the TV series Cars Toons and Cars on the Road. McQueen is a playable character in each of the Cars video game installments, as well as in other Disney/Pixar video games. McQueen is the face of the Cars brand, and he is a popular mascot for Disney.

McQueen is a professional racer in the Piston Cup circuit, which emulates the NASCAR Cup Series, and acquires seven Piston Cup victories through his career. In Cars 2, he competes in the short-lived World Grand Prix. At the end of Cars 3, he assumes the role of a mentor for a new generation of racers.

In the films, McQueen is sponsored by Rust-eze Medicated Bumper Ointment and wears their decals. His body is red with yellow and orange decals, displays the number 95 on his sides, and has blue eyes. His appearance undergoes updates through the films, but generally maintains the same image. McQueen is seen with no paint or decals briefly in Cars 3.

Characterization
During the initial research for the first film, John Lasseter met with General Motors designers to discuss the new Corvette design. However, McQueen's appearance is not attributed to any single car model.

In order to create a cocky but likable character for McQueen, Pixar looked at sports figures like boxer Muhammad Ali, basketball player Charles Barkley, and football quarterback Joe Namath, as well as rap and rock singer Kid Rock.

The end result is a character which, despite the usually meticulous approach to "truth to material" in which each car's animation is mechanically consistent with its respective model's capabilities, can occasionally bend the rules to move more like an athlete than a motorcar.

Lightning McQueen is not named after actor and race driver Steve McQueen, but after Pixar animator Glenn McQueen who died in 2002.

Character design
McQueen's design is primarily inspired by and based on various NASCAR Generation 4 cars; however, he has a curvaceous body like that of the Plymouth Superbird and Dodge Charger Daytona. The exhaust pipes come from the 1970s Dodge Charger, but with four (two on each side) instead of two on one side or one on both sides. His body draws cues from the shape of the Ford GT40 and Lola T70, along with cab prompts from a 1990s Porsche 911. His number was originally set to be 57, a reference to John Lasseter's birth year, but was changed to 95, referencing the release year of Pixar's first film Toy Story. McQueen's engine sounds emulate a Gen 4 in Cars, a mixture of a Gen 5 COT and the Chevrolet Corvette C6.R in Cars 2, and a Gen 6 in Cars 3.

Appearances

Cars (2006)
Lightning McQueen is a rookie racer in the Piston Cup series, and secretly disdains his sponsor Rust-eze, hoping to be chosen for by the more prestigious Dinoco team. McQueen is portrayed as being ungrateful, obnoxious, selfish, and sarcastic. On the road to Los Angeles for a tie-breaker race, McQueen begins to realize he has no true friends. After an encounter with a quartet of tuner cars, McQueen becomes separated from his transport truck, Mack, and ends up lost in Radiator Springs, a forgotten town along U.S. Route 66. He is soon arrested and impounded there.

In Radiator Springs, the local judge Doc Hudson, Sally, and the other townsfolk vote to have McQueen repave the road he destroyed as punishment. He rushes and doesn't do it properly at first before reluctantly accepting help from Hudson. In the process, McQueen learns about the history of Radiator Springs and begins to relate to its inhabitants. McQueen befriends a tow truck named Tow Mater, and he falls in love with Sally. During his time in town, McQueen begins to care about others rather than just himself. He also learns an expert turn from Hudson and some unorthodox moves from Mater, which he later uses in the tie-breaker race.

During the final lap of the race, McQueen witnesses a crash behind him and forfeits the win in order to help Weathers finish the race. McQueen is nonetheless praised for his sportsmanship, so much so that Dinoco race team owner Tex offers to hire him to succeed Weathers. McQueen declines, choosing instead to stay with his Rust-eze sponsors for managing to get him where he was. Tex respects his decision and instead offers to do him a favor any time he needs it. McQueen uses the favor on a ride on the Dinoco helicopter for Mater, fulfilling Mater's dream.

McQueen returns to Radiator Springs to establish his racing headquarters. He resumes his relationship with Sally and becomes Hudson's pupil.

Cars: The Video Game (2006)

Considered a direct continuation of the first film, this game's story picks up where that film ends. McQueen finds himself at the start of the next Piston Cup season. With the help of the citizens of Radiator Springs, McQueen readies to start his quest for the Piston Cup, taking lessons from Hudson, Fillmore, and Mater. With the use of his new skills, McQueen once again finds himself in position to win the Piston Cup, much to the irritation of Chick Hicks.

McQueen's racing gear is stolen from Mack on Interstate 40 when Chick enlists the aid of the Delinquent Road Hazards, the same crew who harassed McQueen in the first film. McQueen is able to retrieve his equipment and bring the delinquents to justice before winning the next race, which sends Chick into a frenzy. McQueen challenges Chick to a Grand Prix in Radiator Springs, followed by one more Piston Cup race in Los Angeles. McQueen wins these events, taking the Piston Cup in his sophomore season.

At the end, McQueen, Mater, and Sally decide to take a celebratory trip across the country. When asked if he brought his trophy, McQueen notes he did not, but left it in a good place, revealed to be at Hudson's clinic next to the racing legend's own three Piston Cups.

Though McQueen is still sponsored by Rust-eze, players are able to unlock McQueen with a Dinoco paint job while playing as him in Story Mode, Arcade Mode, and Versus Mode.

Cars 2 (2011)

Five years after the events of the first film, McQueen, now a four-time Piston Cup champion, returns to Radiator Springs to spend his off-season with his friends. McQueen's respite is interrupted when he is invited to participate in the inaugural World Grand Prix, sponsored by former oil tycoon Miles Axelrod, who hopes to promote his new biofuel, Allinol.

At a pre-race party in Tokyo, Japan, McQueen is embarrassed by Mater and regrets bringing him along. After losing the first race on account of Mater's involvement with spies Finn McMissile and Holley Shiftwell (of which McQueen was unaware), McQueen lashes out at him and tells him he does not want his help anymore, causing Mater to leave. Later, McQueen wins the second race in Porto Corsa, Italy. However, more cars were damaged in the race, causing controversy and increased fears over Allinol's safety. In response, Axelrod decides to remove Allinol as a requirement for the final race in London. McQueen elects to continue with Allinol, unknowingly endangering himself.

During the London race, McQueen sees Mater and apologizes for his outburst in Tokyo. When McQueen approaches him, Mater speeds away because of a bomb planted in his engine compartment that will detonate if McQueen gets too close. Out of the detonator's remote control range, McQueen catches up and realizes the spy mission was real. McQueen goes with Mater and the spies to confront Axelrod, who is later revealed to be the mastermind behind the plot, and force him to disarm the bomb. Following the arrest of Axlerod and his cohorts, McQueen happily declares that Mater can come to all races from now on if he likes. Back in Radiator Springs, it is revealed that McQueen's Allinol supply was switched with Fillmore's organic fuel by Sarge prior to the start of the World Grand Prix, thereby protecting McQueen from danger during the London race. A Grand Prix is then held in the town, featuring all the World Grand Prix contenders.

McQueen's paint scheme in this film is nearly identical to the first film (his large lightning bolt is repainted dark red, and a smaller bolt is threaded through his number, and has only three sponsor stickers on either side), though it is modified for the World Grand Prix with green-tinted flames on the end of his large bolt and a Piston Cup logo on the hood instead of his usual Rust-eze sponsor. His reflective lightning decals are removed, he has a different spoiler, and his sticker headlights and taillights are replaced with actual working lights.

Cars 3 (2017)

Five years after the events of the second film, McQueen, now a seven-time Piston Cup champion and racing legend, races in the series with his long-time racing friends, Cal Weathers and Bobby Swift. High-tech rookie racer Jackson Storm appears and begins to win race after race. McQueen pushes himself too hard while trying to compete with Storm in the final race of the season, injuring himself severely in a dangerous crash. After recovering, McQueen trains with Cruz Ramirez during the off-season in hopes of beating Storm. McQueen's new sponsor Sterling tells him he will have to retire if he loses his next race, where Sterling plans to profit off McQueen's retirement merchandise.
After several unsuccessful attempts at training, McQueen decides to seek out Hudson's old pit boss, Smokey, and eventually meets him at the Thomasville Motor Speedway, in what appears to be the Great Smoky Mountains. Completing this training, McQueen runs the first half of the Florida 500, with Smokey as his crew chief, before pulling out and giving Cruz a shot at stardom, with him as the crew chief. Cruz and McQueen share the victory due to Lightning starting the race, and the pair receive a sponsorship under the merged Dinoco–Rust-eze brand. McQueen embraces the role of mentor for young talent, with Cruz as his pupil.

He reverts to the body type he had back in the first film, but the paint job features a cross between the lightning bolts seen in the first film, and the flames seen in the second film. The bolts are solid colored instead of halftone, the Rust-eze logos were enlarged, and he has fewer sponsor stickers than he had in the first film. He also sports a second paint scheme prior to his crash (with a slightly desaturated red paintwork, a modernized version of the Rust-eze logo and different lightning bolts), a third "training" paint job in which he is darker red with metallic yellow accents, and a fourth "demolition derby" paint job in which he is all mud brown and numbered 15. At the end of the film, McQueen is decked in a blue "Fabulous Lightning McQueen" paint job reminiscent of Hudson's. He also keeps his working lights.

Notable miscellaneous appearances
In the book Struck by Lightning, McQueen reveals that his real name is Montgomery (shorthanded to Monty), and that "Lightning" is a nickname.

Cultural impact

Lightning McQueen's popularity inspired many products, from toys and video games to spin off TV shows and books. He is also a character at the Cars Land, a Cars-themed section of Disney California Adventure.

References

External links
 

Cars (franchise) characters
Cars designed and produced for films
Fictional American people
Fictional racing cars
Fictional racing drivers
Film characters introduced in 2006
Male characters in film
Animated characters introduced in 2006